Kamnaskires IV was the Kamnaskirid king of Elymais from 62/1 BC (or 59/8) to 56/5 BC.

References

Sources 
  (2 volumes)
 
 
 

1st-century BC rulers in Asia
Vassal rulers of the Parthian Empire
Kings of Elymais